Yawhen Kalinin (born 15 August 1993) is a Belarusian professional footballer.

References

External links 
 
 

1993 births
Living people
Belarusian footballers
Association football midfielders
FC BATE Borisov players
FC Slutsk players
FC Smorgon players
FC Vitebsk players
FC Naftan Novopolotsk players
FC Slonim-2017 players
FC Orsha players
FC Dnepr Mogilev players
FC Lokomotiv Gomel players
FC Dnepr Rogachev players